Mathieu van der Poel is a Dutch professional racing cyclist for UCI ProTeam , competing in the cyclo-cross, mountain bike racing and road bicycle racing disciplines of the sport.

Career highlights

2015
 Wins his first UCI Cyclo-cross World Championship title.
 Wins his first National Cyclo-cross Championship title.

2016
 Wins his second National Cyclo-cross Championship title.

2017
 Wins his first UEC European Cyclo-cross Championship title.
 Wins his third National Cyclo-cross Championship title.

2018
 Wins his second UEC European Cyclo-cross Championship title.
 Wins his fourth National Cyclo-cross Championship title.
 Wins his first National Road Championship title.
 Wins his first National XCO Championship title.

2019
 Wins his second UCI Cyclo-cross World Championship title.
 Wins his first UEC European XCO Championship title.
 Wins his third UEC European Cyclo-cross Championship title.
 Wins his fifth National Cyclo-cross Championship title.
 Wins his first three major classics, Amstel Gold Race, Dwars door Vlaanderen and Brabantse Pijl.

2020
 Wins his third UCI Cyclo-cross World Championship title.
 Wins his sixth National Cyclo-cross Championship title.
 Wins his second National Road Championship title.
 Wins his first UCI World Tour stage race, the BinckBank Tour.
 Wins his first monument, Tour of Flanders.

2021
 Wins his fourth UCI Cyclo-cross World Championship title.
 Wins Strade Bianche.
 Wins his first Grand Tour stage, Tour de France Stage 2, wearing the yellow jersey in the process.

2022
 Wins Dwars door Vlaanderen for the second time.
 Wins his second monument, Tour of Flanders for the second time.
 Wins his second Grand Tour stage, Giro d'Italia Stage 1, wearing the pink jersey in the process.

2023
 Wins his fifth UCI Cyclo-cross World Championship title.
 Wins his third monument, Milan-San Remo.

Major championships timeline

Cyclo-cross

2011–2012
 1st  UCI World Junior Championships
 1st  UEC European Junior Championships
 1st  National Junior Championships
 1st  Overall UCI Junior World Cup
1st Tábor
1st Koksijde
1st Liévin
1st Hoogerheide
 1st Overall Junior Superprestige
1st Zonhoven
1st Hamme
1st Gavere
1st Gieten
1st Diegem
1st Hoogstraten
1st Middelkerke
 Junior Gazet van Antwerpen
1st Hasselt
1st Essen
1st Loenhout
1st Baal
1st Sluitingsprijs
 Junior Fidea Classics
1st Namur
 1st Junior Kalmthout
 1st Junior Woerden
 1st Junior Overijse
 1st Junior Heusden-Zolder
 1st Junior Valkenburg
2012–2013
 1st  UCI World Junior Championships
 1st  UEC European Junior Championships
 1st  National Junior Championships
 1st  Overall UCI Junior World Cup
1st Tábor
1st Plzeň
1st Koksijde
1st Heusden-Zolder
1st Rome
1st Hoogerheide
 1st Overall Junior Superprestige
1st Ruddervoorde
1st Zonhoven
1st Hamme
1st Gavere
1st Gieten
1st Diegem
1st Hoogstraten
1st Middelkerke
 1st Overall Junior Bpost Bank Trophy
1st Ronse
1st Koppenberg
1st Hasselt
1st Essen
1st Loenhout
1st Baal
1st Lille
1st Oostmalle
 1st Junior Kalmthout
 1st Junior Frankfurt
 1st Junior Cauberg
2013–2014 (1)
 1st  National Under-23 Championships
 1st  Overall UCI Under-23 World Cup
1st Tábor
1st Koksijde
1st Heusden-Zolder
1st Rome
 1st Overall Under-23 Superprestige
1st Ruddervoorde
1st Hamme
1st Gieten
1st Diegem
 Under-23 Bpost Bank Trophy
1st Ronse
 1st Heerlen
 1st Under-23 Kalmthout
 2nd  UEC European Under-23 Championships
 3rd  UCI World Under-23 Championships
2014–2015 (11)
 1st  UCI World Championships
 1st  National Championships
 UCI World Cup
1st Hoogerheide
 1st Overall Superprestige
1st Gieten
1st Diegem
1st Hoogstraten
 Bpost Bank Trophy
1st Lille
 Soudal Classics
1st Antwerpen
1st Leuven
1st Waregem
 1st Sint-Niklaas
 1st Heerlen
2015–2016 (11)
 1st  National Championships
 UCI World Cup
1st Namur
1st Heusden-Zolder
1st Lignières-en-Berry
1st Hoogerheide
 Superprestige
1st Diegem
1st Hoogstraten
1st Middelkerke
 1st Overijse
 1st Otegem
 1st Zonnebeke
2016–2017 (22)
 1st  National Championships
 UCI World Cup
1st Cauberg
1st Zeven
1st Namur
 1st Overall Superprestige
1st Gieten
1st Zonhoven
1st Ruddervoorde
1st Gavere
1st Diegem
1st Hoogstraten
1st Middelkerke
 DVV Verzekeringen Trophy
1st Hamme
1st Antwerpen
1st Lille
 Brico Cross
1st Meulebeke
1st Maldegem
1st Hulst
 Soudal Classics
1st Leuven
 1st Brabant
 1st Mol
 1st Overijse
 1st Otegem
 2nd  UCI World Championships
 2nd  UEC European Championships
2017–2018 (31)
 1st  UEC European Championships
 1st  National Championships
 1st  Overall UCI World Cup
1st Iowa City
1st Waterloo
1st Koksijde
1st Bogense
1st Heusden-Zolder
1st Nommay
1st Hoogerheide
 1st Overall Superprestige
1st Gieten
1st Zonhoven
1st Ruddervoorde
1st Diegem
1st Hoogstraten
1st Middelkerke
 1st Overall DVV Verzekeringen Trophy
1st Koppenberg
1st Hamme
1st Essen
1st Antwerpen
1st Loenhout
1st Baal
1st Lille
 Brico Cross
1st Eeklo
1st Meulebeke
1st Kruibeke
1st Hulst
 Soudal Classics
1st Waregem
 1st Waterloo
 1st Brabant
 1st Overijse
 1st Otegem
 1st Oostmalle
 3rd  UCI World Championships
2018–2019 (32)
 1st  UCI World Championships
 1st  UEC European Championships
 1st  National Championships
 3rd Overall UCI World Cup
1st Bern
1st Tábor
1st Koksijde
1st Namur
1st Heusden-Zolder
1st Hoogerheide
 1st Overall Superprestige
1st Gieten
1st Boom
1st Ruddervoorde
1st Gavere
1st Zonhoven
1st Diegem
1st Hoogstraten
1st Middelkerke
 1st Overall DVV Verzekeringen Trophy
1st Niel
1st Hamme
1st Antwerpen
1st Loenhout
1st Baal
1st Brussels
1st Lille
 Brico Cross
1st Meulebeke
1st Ronse
1st Maldegem
1st Hulst
 Soudal Classics
1st Sint-Niklaas
 1st Wachtebeke
 1st Gullegem
 1st Otegem
2019–2020 (24)
 1st  UCI World Championships
 1st  UEC European Championships
 1st  National Championships
 UCI World Cup
1st Tábor
1st Koksijde
1st Namur
1st Heusden-Zolder
1st Hoogerheide
 Superprestige
1st Ruddervoorde
1st Diegem
 3rd Overall DVV Verzekeringen Trophy
1st Hamme
1st Kortrijk
1st Loenhout
1st Baal
1st Brussels
 Ethias Cross
1st Bredene
 Rectavit Series
1st Niel
1st Sint-Niklaas
 1st Wachtebeke
 1st Mol
 1st Overijse
 1st Gullegem
 1st Otegem
 1st Zonnebeke
2020–2021 (10)
 1st  UCI World Championships
 2nd Overall UCI World Cup
1st Namur
1st Hulst
 Superprestige
1st Heusden-Zolder
 X²O Badkamers Trophy
1st Antwerpen
1st Baal
1st Hamme
 Ethias Cross
1st Essen
1st Bredene
 1st Gullegem
2022–2023 (7)
 1st  UCI World Championships
 UCI World Cup
1st Hulst
1st Antwerpen
1st Gavere
1st Benidorm
1st Besançon
 X²O Badkamers Trophy
1st Herentals

UCI World Cup results

Superprestige results

Trofee results

Road

2011
 1st  Time trial, National Novice Championships
2012
 1st  Overall Ronde des Vallées
1st  Young rider classification
 1st  Mountains classification, Trofeo Karlsberg
 2nd Remouchamps-Ferrières-Remouchamps
 3rd Grand Prix Bati-Metallo
 4th Overall Regio-Tour
 6th Overall Tour du Valromey
1st  Young rider classification
 9th Road race, UCI World Junior Championships
2013
 1st  Road race, UCI World Junior Championships
 1st  Road race, National Junior Championships
 1st  Overall Tour du Valromey
1st Stages 1 & 4
 1st  Overall Trophée Centre Morbihan
1st  Points classification
1st Stage 1
 1st  Overall Grand Prix Rüebliland
1st  Points classification
1st Stages 1, 2 & 3 (ITT)
 2nd Overall Grand Prix Général Patton
1st  Points classification
1st  Mountains classification
1st Stage 2
 3rd Overall Course de la Paix Juniors
1st Stage 1
2014 (4)
 1st  Overall Baltic Chain Tour
1st  Sprints classification
1st  Young rider classification
1st Stage 4
 1st Ronde van Limburg
 6th Overall Tour Alsace
1st Stage 3
 7th Omloop der Kempen
 10th Road race, UCI World Under-23 Championships
2015
 4th Overall Tour Alsace
 6th Overall Tour of Belgium
 6th Circuit de Wallonie
2016
 8th Ronde van Limburg
2017 (5)
 1st  Overall Boucles de la Mayenne
1st  Points classification
1st  Young rider classification
1st Stages 2 & 3
 1st Dwars door het Hageland
 1st Stage 2 Tour of Belgium
 2nd Bruges Cycling Classic
2018 (6)
 1st  Road race, National Championships
 1st  Overall Boucles de la Mayenne
1st Stage 1
 1st Ronde van Limburg
 Arctic Race of Norway
1st  Points classification
1st Stages 1 & 4
 2nd  Road race, UEC European Championships
2019 (11)
 1st  Overall Tour of Britain
1st Stages 4, 7 & 8
 1st Brabantse Pijl
 1st Dwars door Vlaanderen
 1st Grand Prix de Denain
 1st Amstel Gold Race
 1st Stage 1 Tour of Antalya
 1st Stage 1 Arctic Race of Norway
 4th Gent–Wevelgem
 4th Tour of Flanders
 6th Famenne Ardenne Classic
 10th Overall Circuit de la Sarthe
1st Stage 1
2020 (5)
 1st  Road race, National Championships
 1st  Overall BinckBank Tour
1st Stage 5
 1st Tour of Flanders
 1st Stage 7 Tirreno–Adriatico
 2nd Brabantse Pijl
 3rd Gran Piemonte
 3rd Druivenkoers Overijse
 4th Road race, UEC European Championships
 6th Liège–Bastogne–Liège
 9th Gent–Wevelgem
 10th Giro di Lombardia
2021 (8)
 1st Strade Bianche
 1st Antwerp Port Epic
 Tour de France
1st Stage 2
Held  after Stages 2–7
Held  after Stage 2
 Tirreno–Adriatico
1st Stages 3 & 5
 Tour de Suisse
1st Stages 2 & 3
 1st Stage 1 UAE Tour
 2nd Tour of Flanders
 3rd Paris–Roubaix
 3rd E3 Saxo Bank Classic
 5th Milan–San Remo
 8th Road race, UCI World Championships
 8th Primus Classic
2022 (5)
 1st Tour of Flanders
 1st Dwars door Vlaanderen
 1st Grand Prix de Wallonie
 Giro d'Italia
1st Stage 1
Held  after Stages 1–3
Held  after Stages 1–4
Held  after Stages 1–2
 1st Stage 4 Settimana Internazionale di Coppi e Bartali
 3rd Milan–San Remo
 4th Amstel Gold Race
 9th Paris–Roubaix
2023 (1)
 1st Milan–San Remo

Grand Tour general classification results timeline

Classics results timeline

Mountain Bike

2016 (2)
 1st GP Stad Beringen
 1st Stage 1 Afxentia Stage Race
2017 (3)
 1st  Overall Belgian Challenge
1st Stages 1 & 2
 UCI XCO World Cup
2nd Albstadt
 4th Marathon, UCI World Championships
2018 (8)
 1st  Cross-country, National Championships
 1st  Overall La Rioja Bike Race
1st Stages 1, 2 & 3
 2nd Overall UCI XCO World Cup
3rd Albstadt
3rd Val di Sole
3rd Vallnord
 UCI XCC World Cup
1st Albstadt
1st Val di Sole
1st La Bresse
 3rd  Cross-country, UCI World Championships
2019 (14)
 1st  Cross-country, UEC European Championships
 1st  Overall Belgian Challenge
1st Prologue, Stages 1, 2 & 3
 2nd Overall UCI XCO World Cup
1st Nové Město
1st Val di Sole
1st Lenzerheide
2nd Albstadt
 UCI XCC World Cup
1st Albstadt
1st Nové Město
1st Les Gets
1st Val di Sole
1st Lenzerheide
2021 (2)
 UCI XCC World Cup
1st Albstadt
1st Nové Město
 UCI XCO World Cup
2nd Nové Město

UCI World Cup results

Gravel
2022
 3rd  UCI World Championships

References

Career achievements of cyclists